Digimon Battle Spirit is a fighting video game originally published by Bandai and developed by Dimps for the Japanese-only WonderSwan Color handheld system under the name . It was later ported to Nintendo's Game Boy Advance for international releases in North America and Europe two years later.

The game features characters and Digimon that were included in the first three seasons of the animated series of the same name in a somewhat simplistic fighting scenario, and also has slightly arranged samples of the show's soundtrack.

Gameplay

While structured very similarly to a conventional fighting game, Digimon Battle Spirit is much more like a barebones representation of the genre, mostly due to the limitations of the handhelds it was released on. Each character only has a handful of special attacks they can perform, with the two action buttons, A and B, allowing them to jump or attack respectively.

Each match is won by collecting small blue/red spheres called "D-Spirits". These are obtained by hitting your opponent, which causes a few of them to fly from their body and scatter across the battlefield. Different attacks can produce more spheres to fly out, and the player who has collected the most by the time the round ends wins. Each character can also digivolve into their most powerful or "Ultimate" (Mega) form by touching a flying Digimon named Calumon that appears every so often in each stage. This form grants them different, more powerful attacks for a limited time.

As the player advances through each stage, they will occasionally have to battle a character named Impmon. Winning or losing this encounter has no bearing on the actual game progression itself, and only serves to award more points. In the final stage, the Digimon must face off against Millenniummon himself.

Plot
The Digital World, a computer-generated subspace that exists between all forms of digital devices, and home of the creatures known as "Digimon" is under attack by a malevolent and powerful force known as Millenniummon, who seeks to corrupt all the data present in the world and modify it to his own designs. In response, several Digimon and their human companions have set out to stop Millenniummon and his minions before any irreparable harm can be done. This is accomplished in a very round-about and a-typical way to the fighting video game genre, by finding and defeating as many opponents as possible on the way.

Reception

Digimon Battle Spirit received "mixed or average" reviews according to review aggregator Metacritic.

IGN selected Digimon Battle Spirit as the runner-up for the January 2003 "GBA Game of the Month" award, behind Crash Bandicoot 2: N-Tranced.

References

External links 
Digimon Battle Spirit @ Gamefaqs

2001 video games
Battle_Spirit
Dimps games
Fighting games
Game Boy Advance games
Platform fighters
Video games developed in Japan
WonderSwan Color games